Mitchelleae is a tribe of flowering plants in the family Rubiaceae and contains 14 species in 2 genera. Its representatives are found from eastern China to temperate eastern Asia, and from eastern Canada to Guatemala.

Genera 
Currently accepted names
 Damnacanthus C.F.Gaertn. (12 sp)
 Mitchella L. (2 sp)

Synonyms
 Baumannia DC. = Damnacanthus
 Chamaedaphne Mitch. = Mitchella
 Disperma J.F.Gmel. = Mitchella
 Geoherpum Willd. = Mitchella
 Perdicesca Prov. = Mitchella
 Tetraplasia Rehder = Damnacanthus

References 

Rubioideae tribes